Phoxinus oxyrhynchus is a species of freshwater fish in the family Cyprinidae. It is endemic to the Korean peninsula.

References

Phoxinus
Taxa named by Tamezo Mori
Fish described in 1930